Collage is a compilation album by American glam metal band Ratt. It consists of alternate recordings, B-sides, and versions of songs from the band's Mickey Ratt period. It was mostly recorded and released in 1997, concurrently with Ratt's reunion tour, so that they would have a new album to promote. In 1998, the band would sign a new major label deal with Sony.

The track "Mother Blues" first appeared as an Arcade song on their 1993 self-titled release, but was originally a Ratt demo, ending up on Collage. "Steel River" is an alternate version of the Mickey Ratt song "Railbreak".

Track listing

Personnel
Ratt
 Stephen Pearcy – lead vocals, rhythm guitar (tracks 1, 2, 4, 8, 9) producer
 Warren DeMartini – lead and rhythm guitar, acoustic guitar, dobro (track 1), slide guitar (track 6), backing vocals, producer
 Bobby Blotzer – drums, percussion
 Robbie Crane – bass guitar
 Robbin Crosby – rhythm guitars on tracks 6, 8, 10
 Juan Croucier – bass on tracks 3, 5, 8, 10

Additional musicians
Billy Sherwood – bass on track 6

Production
Billy Sherwood – engineer
Joe Floyd, Sean Kenesie – engineers on tracks 5, 7, 8
Sir Arthur Payson, Steve Heinke – engineers on track 10
Joe Gastwirt – mastering

References

Ratt albums
1997 compilation albums
Victor Entertainment compilation albums